Dicranolaius is a genus of soft-winged flower beetle in the family Melyridae.

References

External links

 

Melyridae
Cleroidea genera